Dudley North may refer to:
Dudley North, 3rd Baron North (1581–1666), English nobleman and politician
Dudley North, 4th Baron North (1602–1677), English nobleman and politician, son of the above
Sir Dudley North (economist) (1641–1691), English economist, son of the above
Dudley North (politician, born 1684) (1684–1730), English landowner and politician, son of the above
Dudley Long North (1748–1829), English Whig politician, great-grandson of the economist
Sir Dudley North (Royal Navy officer) (1881–1961), Royal Navy admiral
Dudley North (UK Parliament constituency)

North, Dudley